John Ekels (born 2 December 1940) is a Canadian sailor.  He won a bronze medal in the Soling Class at the 1972 Summer Olympics.

References
 Profile at sports-reference.com

1940 births
Living people
Canadian male sailors (sport)
Olympic sailors of Canada
Olympic bronze medalists for Canada
Olympic medalists in sailing
People from Batavia, Dutch East Indies
Sailors at the 1972 Summer Olympics – Soling
Medalists at the 1972 Summer Olympics
20th-century Canadian people